Edward Chávez may refer to:

 Edward Chávez (artist) (1917–1995), American artist
 Edward L. Chávez (born 1956), New Mexico Supreme Court judge
 Edward Chavez (politician), California politician, mayor of Stockton